The 1975 Michigan State Spartans football team represented Michigan State University during the 1975 Big Ten Conference football season. Led by Denny Stolz in his third and final season as head coach, the Spartans compiled an overall record of 7–4 with a mark of 4–4, placing in a three-way tie for third in the Big Ten.

Schedule

Roster

Game summaries

Notre Dame

References

Michigan State
Michigan State Spartans football seasons
Michigan State Spartans football